Tenabo may refer to:

 Tenabo, a city in the Mexican state of Campeche
 Tenabo Municipality, a municipality in the Mexican state of Campeche
 Mount Tenabo, a peak in Nevada, US